Ares is a 2006 Marvel Comics comic book limited series starring the character of the same name is written by Michael Avon Oeming and pencilled by Travel Foreman.

Plot summary
After abandoning the Olympian pantheon, the Greek god Ares poses as a mortal, raising his son Alexander. When Alexander is kidnapped by Ares' father Zeus and then captured by the evil Japanese god Amatsu-Mikaboshi, Ares joins forces with Zeus and half-brother Hercules to rescue his son.

Collected editions
The series is collected in the trade paperback Ares: God of War.

Notes

References

 
 

Classical mythology in Marvel Comics
Ares in popular culture